British NVC community OV4 (Chrysanthemum segetum - Spergula arvensis community) is one of the open habitat communities in the British National Vegetation Classification system. It is one of six arable weed and track-side communities of light, less-fertile acid soils.

It is widely distributed, and there are two subcommunities.

Community composition

The following constant species are found in this community:
 Corn marigold (Chrysanthemum segetum)
 Annual meadow-grass (Poa annua)
 Knotgrass (Polygonum aviculare)
 Corn spurrey (Spergula arvensis)

No rare species are associated with the community.

Distribution

This is a widely distributed community, most commonly found in western Britain.

Subcommunities

The two subcommunities are:
 the so-called typical subcommunity
 the Ranunculus repens - Sonchus asper subcommunity

References

OV04